Chuk Yuen North is one of the 25 constituencies of the Wong Tai Sin District Council. The seat elects one member of the council every four years. The boundary is loosely based on upon the area of Chuk Yuen North Estate.

Councillors represented

Election results

2010s

2000s

1990s

Notes

References

2011 District Council Election Results (Wong Tai Sin)
2007 District Council Election Results (Wong Tai Sin)
2003 District Council Election Results (Wong Tai Sin)
1999 District Council Election Results (Wong Tai Sin)
 

Constituencies of Hong Kong
Constituencies of Wong Tai Sin District Council
1991 establishments in Hong Kong
Constituencies established in 1991